Oo Solriya Oo Oohm Solriya (ஊ சொல்றியா ஓஓஓம் சொல்றியா) is a 2022 Indian-Tamil language Quiz reality television show airs on Star Vijay and streamed on Disney+ Hotstar. It premiered on 4 September 2022, and aired on every Sunday at 20:00. Ma Ka Pa Anand and Priyanka Deshpande as the hosts. It is a Yes or No Based quiz show, where the Tamil Television celebrities enter to win a huge cash prize by using their intelligence.

The show first season was ended with 26 Episode from 19 March 2023.

Overview

Show Format
In this season, every Participants will play four rounds to get through. It is a Yes or No Based quiz show. At the end of every round participant with max points gets to choose the prize maney by taking a wild guess and getting convinced by hosts to choose the prize which they have. For instance, both hosts state a fact general knowledge based easy facts mostly Tamil film based. 

They manipulate the question and ask the player to choose the right answer. Eventually the player must choose their game by saying Oom or Oohoom as to continue the game.

Host
 Ma Ka Pa Anand
 Tamil actor and television presenter who has been working with Star Vijay. 

 Priyanka Deshpande
 Indian television presenter, host and actress. She predominantly works in Tamil television and film industry.

Contenstant

Show Title
This title was taken from a 2022 Pushpa: The Rise movie song starring Allu Arjun and Samantha Ruth Prabhu.

References

External links
 Oo Solriya Oo Oohm Solriya at Disney+ Hotstar

Star Vijay original programming
Tamil-language television shows
Tamil-language game shows
Tamil-language quiz shows
Tamil-language reality television series
2022 Tamil-language television series debuts
Television shows set in Tamil Nadu
2023 Tamil-language television series endings